Bañugues is one of thirteen parishes (administrative divisions) in the Gozón municipality, within the province and autonomous community of Asturias, in northern Spain, near "Peñas" cape.

The population is 647 (INE 2007).

Villages and hamlets
Cerín 
La Ribera
El Monte
El Pueblo (El Llugar)
La Quintana
La Playa
La Espina

References

Parishes in Gozón